LaMura is a surname. Notable people with the surname include:

 B. J. LaMura (born 1981), American-born baseball player
 Mark LaMura (1948–2017), American actor

See also
Mura (surname)